The Western Mindanao Command (abbrv. as WESTMINCOM) is the Armed Forces of the Philippines' unified command in charge of the Zamboanga Peninsula, Northern Mindanao, and the BARMM. It is responsible for the defense of these areas against external aggresion, as well as combating terrorism and insurgency. It is also one of the government organizations advocating the "Culture of Peace" in Mindanao.

Organization
The following are the units that are under the Western Mindanao Command.
 1st Infantry (TABAK) Division, PA
 6th Infantry Division, PA
 11th Infantry (Alakdan) Division, PA
 2nd Scout Ranger Battalion, PA
 1st Light Reaction Battalion, PA
 3rd Air Division, PAF
 Naval Forces Western Mindanao, PN

Operations
 Anti-guerrilla operations against the New People's Army.
 Anti-terrorist operations against the Abu Sayyaf operating in their AOR.
 Anti-terrorist operations against Islamic State of Iraq and the Levant in the Battle of Marawi.

Lineage of Commander
 LtGen. Eugenio V. Cedo, AFP – (28 August 2006 – 05 September 2007)
 LtGen. Nelson N. Allaga, AFP – (05 September 2007 – 16 July 2009)
 LtGen. Benjamin M. Dolorfino, AFP – (16 July 2009 – 10 November 2010)
 LtGen. Raymundo B. Ferrer, AFP – (10 November 2010 – 22 January 2012)
 LtGen. Noel A. Coballes, AFP – (22 January 2012 - 22 October 2012)
 LtGen. Rey C. Ardo, AFP – (22 October 2012 – 08 November 2013)
 LtGen. Rustico O. Guerrero, AFP – (08 November 2013 – 24 November 2015)
 LtGen. Mayoralgo M. Dela Cruz, AFP – (24 November 2015 – 17 January 2017)
 LtGen. Carlito G. Galvez Jr., AFP – (17 January 2017 – 18 May 2018)
 LtGen. Arnel B. Dela Vega, AFP – (18 May 2018 – 28 June 2019)
 LtGen. Cirilito E. Sobejana, AFP – (28 June 2019 – 18 August 2020)
 LtGen. Corleto S. Vinluan Jr., AFP – (18 August 2020 – 24 August 2021)
 MGen. Generoso M. Ponio, PA – (24 August 2021 – 23 September 2021) (acting)
 LtGen. Alfredo V. Rosario Jr., AFP – (23 September 2021 – 04 October 2022) 
 BGen. Arturo G. Rojas, PN(M) – (04 October 2022 – 20 January 2023) (acting)
 LtGen. Roy M. Galido, AFP – (20 January 2023 - present)

Gallery

References

 AFP GO# 1035 Section II
 Philippine Army: The First 100 Years
 Military Science 21 ROTC Manual, NCR RCDG, ARESCOM

External links
 Official Site of the AFP

Regional commands of the Philippines
Department of National Defense (Philippines)
Zamboanga City